Middletown is a town in Frederick County, Virginia, United States, in the northern Shenandoah Valley. The population was 1,265 at the 2010 census, up from 1,015 at the 2000 census.

History 
Middletown was chartered on May 4, 1796. Some of the first documentation of early Middletown dates back to the late 18th century and is attributed to Dr. Peter Senseney and his wife Magdelen, two German settlers who had migrated from Pennsylvania. The town was originally known as "Senseney Town", a piece of land within the 17th Century Fairfax Grant and gifted to the allies for siding with England during the civil war in the 1600s.

Belle Grove Plantation, about a mile southwest of Middletown, was first settled in about 1750, and its historic Federal-style manor house was completed in 1797. Middletown was the site of numerous military operations in the American Civil War including the Battle of Cedar Creek, fought just south of the town. The area where this battle occurred has been protected as part of the Cedar Creek and Belle Grove National Historical Park. Because the town was founded long before the Civil War, its antebellum history is extensive, as evidenced by the fact that Middletown's Wayside Inn purports to be the longest continuously running inn in America. Wayside Theatre, also located in Middletown, was one of Virginia's oldest professional live theaters (opened 1961, closed 2013). The town is home to Lord Fairfax Community College.

In addition to Belle Grove Plantation, Long Meadow, the Middletown Historic District, Fort Bowman, Monte Vista, Old Forge Farm, and St. Thomas Chapel are listed on the National Register of Historic Places. In 2012 the town of Middletown elected the youngest mayor in Virginia history at the age of 24, Charles Hamilton Harbaugh IV. He was reelected in 2016.

Geography
Middletown is located in southern Frederick County at  (39.027989, −78.279273).

The town lies on a ridge between Meadow Brook to the northwest and tributaries of Molly Booth Run to the southeast. It is part of the watershed of the North Fork of the Shenandoah River.

Climate 
Middletown has a Humid Subtropical climate, with hot, humid summers, and cool winters with moderate snowfall.  January lows average 22.9F, while July highs average 86.9.  Snowfall averages 23.2 inches per year and precipitation averages 40.2 inches per year.

Transportation
U.S. Route 11 (Main Street) runs through the center of Middletown and extends northeast-southwest, serving primarily as a local service road for nearby Interstate 81. Exit 302 along I-81 connects with Reliance Road just east of the town limits, providing direct access to Middletown. I-81 extends north to eastern West Virginia, western Maryland, Pennsylvania and New York, and southwest to Tennessee. It interchanges with Interstate 66 just to the south of Middletown, which extends eastward to Washington, D.C.

Demographics

As of the census of 2000, there were 1,015 people, 409 households and 280 families residing in the town. The population density was 1,851.9 per square mile (712.5/km2). There were 432 housing units at an average density of 788.2 per square mile (303.3/km2). The racial makeup of the town was 93.69% White, 4.43% African American, 0.20% Native American, 0.39% Asian, 0.30% Pacific Islander, and 0.99% from two or more races. Hispanic or Latino of any race were 0.79% of the population.

There were 409 households, out of which 35.5% had children under the age of 18 living with them, 49.1% were married couples living together, 14.2% had a female householder with no husband present, and 31.3% were non-families. 27.6% of all households were made up of individuals, and 10.0% had someone living alone who was 65 years of age or older. The average household size was 2.48 and the average family size was 2.96.

In the town, the population was spread out, with 26.7% under the age of 18, 8.4% from 18 to 24, 32.9% from 25 to 44, 20.5% from 45 to 64, and 11.5% who were 65 years of age or older. The median age was 36 years. For every 100 females, there were 89.4 males. For every 100 females age 18 and over, there were 86.0 males.

The median income for a household in the town was $36,538 and the median income for a family was $42,031. Males had a median income of $30,893 and females $23,125. The per capita income was $18,613. About 6.8% of families and 7.6% of the population were below the poverty line, including 4.9% of those under age 18 and 11.9% of those age 65 or over.

References

External links

 

Towns in Frederick County, Virginia
U.S. Route 11